Harriet Gouldsmith (1787 – 6 January 1863) was an English landscape painter and etcher.

Biography
Gouldsmith was a  pupil of William Mulready, with whom she has been romantically linked, and through him met John Linnell, who was an influence on her work. She painted in both oils and watercolour, first exhibiting her work in 1807 at the Academy and continuing to show there until 1859 (contributing Landscape with Woodcutters' Cottages in Kent). She also exhibited at the Water Colour Society (up to 1820), of which she was elected a member in 1813, the British Institution and, occasionally, the Suffolk Street Gallery.

Apart from landscapes, she also painted a few portraits and one subject picture on the theme of "Don Quixote". In 1819, she published four landscape etchings of Claremont, and in 1824, four landscape lithographs. She was said to be an expert etcher and "drew on stone for lithographer Hullmandel".<ref>Redgrave. A history of water-colour painting in England (SPCK, 1905) p. 140.</ref>

In 1839, she married Captain Arnold, R.N., and from then on exhibited under her married name. In that year she published, anonymously, a book illustrated with her work, A Voice from a Picture''.

Harriet Arnold died on 6 January 1863, aged 76.

See also
English women painters from the early 19th century who exhibited at the Royal Academy of Art

 Sophie Gengembre Anderson
 Mary Baker
 Ann Charlotte Bartholomew
 Maria Bell
 Barbara Bodichon
 Joanna Mary Boyce
 Margaret Sarah Carpenter
 Fanny Corbaux
 Rosa Corder
 Mary Ellen Edwards
 Mary Harrison (artist)
 Jane Benham Hay
 Anna Mary Howitt
 Mary Moser
 Martha Darley Mutrie
 Ann Mary Newton
 Emily Mary Osborn
 Kate Perugini
 Louise Rayner
 Ellen Sharples
 Rolinda Sharples
 Rebecca Solomon
 Elizabeth Emma Soyer
 Isabelle de Steiger
 Henrietta Ward

References

Attribution:

External links
A view of Hampstead Heath looking towards Cannon Place (Oil on board – Christie's)
South view of the watermill, Ventnor, Isle of Wight  (Oil on canvas – Christie's)

English women painters
English watercolourists
English etchers
Landscape artists
English portrait painters
1787 births
1863 deaths
Women watercolorists
Women etchers